Sky Hook (Небеска удица) is a 2000 Yugoslavian film directed by Ljubiša Samardžić. It was Yugoslavia's submission to the 73rd Academy Awards for the Academy Award for Best Foreign Language Film, but was not accepted as a nominee.

Cast

References

External links
 

2000 films
2000s war drama films
Yugoslav Wars films
Serbian war drama films
Italian war drama films
2000s Serbian-language films
Films set in Serbia
Films set in Belgrade
2000 drama films
Films shot in Belgrade
Basketball films